Woodville High School is a secondary school in Woodville, a north western suburb of Adelaide, South Australia. It was opened in 1915.

The school provides music, performing and visual arts and sporting programs and has achieved success in these activities, with students winning Gold, Silver and Bronze placings in the Generations in Jazz competition held annually in Mount Gambier. In 2007, the Stage Band's saxophone section was deemed the best of the Generations in Jazz competition, which won them a small cash prize and a trophy which is displayed amongst the many others. The school's Music Center is also known for the variety of curriculum options with possible international outcomes in areas including: performance, sound engineering and composition. However, these curriculum options are largely based on Jazz or modern musical theory.

It is one of four Special Interest Music Centres, with those at Brighton Secondary School and Marryatville High School set up 1976, Woodville High School in 1977 and Playford International College (then "Fremont High School") in 1978 covering four distinct geographical areas of Adelaide.

The school participates in a variety of activities including the Vietnamese Moon Festival, Glendi, Dozynki and Carnevale.

The school has also won the Rock Eisteddfod Challenge, in 2007.

Notable alumnae
Bruce Abernethy, Australian rules player - Port Adelaide and Adelaide
Greg Anderson, Australian rules player - Port Adelaide, Essendon and Adelaide Football Club
Mario Andreacchio, movie producer/director
Justice Terry Connolly, Supreme Court, Australian Capital Territory
Bryan Dawe, political satirist, writer, actor
Bruce Dooland, Australian Test cricketer
Eric Freeman, Australian Test cricketer
Tim Ginever, Australian rules player
Robert Haigh, Olympian hockey 4 times, Silver medalist, Australian hockey coach
Neil Hawke, Australian Test cricketer, Australian Rules footballer
Alf Jarvis, teacher, Cape Horner (1915-2018)
Rob Kelvin, newsreader
David Kemp, Australian plant geneticist and parasitologist (1945–2013)
Bruce McAvaney, sports broadcaster
Geof Motley, Australian rules player
Charlie Perkins, Australian soccer player, indigenous political activist
Mark Peters, Australian baseball player, Sporting Administrator
Michelangelo Rucci, journalist
Dr Samer Shahin, business leader
Bob Simunsen, Australian Rules footballer, Interstate cricketer
Jan Stirling, Australian basketball player and coach
Tim Wall, Australian Test cricketer

External links
Woodville High School

Public schools in South Australia
Schools of the performing arts in Australia
Rock Eisteddfod Challenge participants
Special interest high schools in South Australia
Educational institutions established in 1915
1915 establishments in Australia